Pain Darb-e Pain (also Romanized as Pā’īn Darb-e Pā’īn; also known as Pā Nahr-e Pā’īn and Pāyandarb-e Soflá) is a village in Gevar Rural District, Sarduiyeh District, Jiroft County, Kerman Province, Iran. At the 2006 census, its population was 112, in 21 families.

References 

Populated places in Jiroft County